Zorro Garden Nudist Colony was an attraction at the 1935-36 Pacific International Exposition in Balboa Park in San Diego, California. It was located in Zoro Garden, a sunken garden originally created for the 1915-16 Panama-California Exposition. Billed as a nudist colony, it was populated by hired performers rather than actual practicing nudists. The women wore only G-strings; the men wore loincloths or trunks. The participants lounged around in their "colony", played volleyball and other games, and performed a quasi-religious "Sacrifice to the Sun God" five times a day. Fair attendees could pay for admission to bleacher-type seats, or they could peek through knotholes in a wooden fence for free. On August 27, 1936, the colony closed, allegedly "after an argument with Exposition officials about finances."

Contemporary newspaper accounts indicate the "colony" was composed of actual nudists, but local historian Matthew Alice has stated that the women were "wearing flesh-colored bras, G-strings, or body stockings so everything was zipped up tight." However, the women were indeed topless, as countless un-doctored photographs plainly show.

Controversy
Protests came from the San Diego Council of Catholic Women, the Women's Civic Center and the San Diego Braille Club. In response the city manager announced that there would be no "indecent" shows in Balboa Park during the second season of the exposition, which opened in February 1936. However, the nudist colony was still there during the second season.

The San Diego County district attorney, Thomas Whalen, inspected the colony the day before the opening of the exposition in May 1935 and approved it. Next month, "amateur nudists" demanded that Whalen investigate the showgirls as frauds, but he declined. One of the Zorro women rode through the fairgrounds at Gold Gulch on a burro and was arrested, but she was "acquitted and rode again under police supervision."

References 

Balboa Park (San Diego)
Gardens in California
History of San Diego
Naturism in the United States
Naturist resorts